Compositions using the octatonic scale:

Radiohead
"Just" (1995). The octaves in the intro/2nd part of chorus played by Jonny Greenwood

Béla Bartók
Harvest Song (Ara táskor) Violin Duo # 33
 Frederic Chopin

Ballade No. 1 in G Minor, Op. 23 :  (bars 130-132)
Etude in F Minor, Op. 10, No. 9: (bars 28-30)

 Charles Ives
The Unanswered Question (solo trumpet part)

Julian Cochran
Piano Sonata No. 1 (1st mov.) 
 Fire Dance 
 Animation Suite, Tin Sentinel 
 Animation Suite, Clockwork Doll 
 Trio for violin, oboe and piano, Artemis (2nd mov.) 
 Prelude No. 9 
 Mazurka No. 1 

Madeleine Dring
Lilliburlero Variations for Two Pianos

Prince Edmond de Polignac
Échos de l'Orient judaïque (1879)
"Chant à la lune", incidental music to Salammbô (1886)

Joseph Haydn
String Quartet in F minor, Op. 20 No. 5

The Human Abstract
"Digital Veil" (2011)

 King Crimson
 "Red" (1974).
Zoltán Kodály
Sonata for Violoncello and Piano, Mov. II (1910)

Sergei Rachmaninoff
 Trio élégiaque No. 2

Nikolai Rimsky-Korsakov
Sadko (1867)

Arnold Schoenberg
Piano Piece, Op. 23, no. 3 (1923)

Franz Schubert
Symphony No. 8, 1st mvt., bars 13-20
Piano Sonata in C major, D 840 (Schubert), 1st mvt bars 31-39
Alexander Scriabin
Prelude Op. 74 No. 3 (Scriabin) (1914)
Piano Sonata No. 9, op. 68 (1912-13), melody from bar 5 onwards

Juan Maria Solare
Octango (2005)
Transfuga

Igor Stravinsky
Petroushka (1911)
The Rite of Spring (1913)
Les Noces (1923)
Symphony of Psalms (1930)
Agon, "Pas de deux" (1957)

Kenneth Leighton
Magnificat from the Second Service, Op. 62 (1972)

Toru Takemitsu
Distance de Fée, SJ1050 (1951)

Die Antwoord
Fok julle Naaiers (2011). Piano line in the intro is octatonic, bass synth adds a ninth tone.

Adi Morag
"Octabones" (1999)
Orbital
Oolaa from the Green Album

Sources

Octatonic scale